Wyszków  is a village in the administrative district of Gmina Liw, within Węgrów County, Masovian Voivodeship, in east-central Poland.

The village has a population of 320.

Monuments 
 3 wayside shrines (18th century)

References

Villages in Węgrów County